Martina Hingis was the defending champion but did not compete that year.

Mary Pierce won in the final 6–3, 7–5 against Dominique Van Roost.

Seeds
A champion seed is indicated in bold text while text in italics indicates the round in which that seed was eliminated. The top four seeds received a bye to the second round.

  Jana Novotná (semifinals)
  Iva Majoli (quarterfinals)
  Mary Pierce (champion)
  Nathalie Tauziat (semifinals)
  Anke Huber (quarterfinals)
  Dominique Van Roost (final)
  Barbara Paulus (quarterfinals)
  Sabine Appelmans (second round)

Draw

Final

Section 1

Section 2

External links
 1998 Open Gaz de France Draw

Open GDF Suez
1998 WTA Tour